Fuxingmen Inner Street is a major street in urban Beijing. It forms part of the extended Chang'an Avenue.

It starts at Fuxingmen Bridge in the west, finishing at West Chang'an Avenue in the east.

The Xidan commercial area is in the neighbourhood of the street, flanked by other more modern buildings, such as the Beijing Times Square. The impressive building of the Bank of China also sits on this street, together with the People's Bank of China.

Line 1 of the Beijing subway runs along this route.

Streets in Beijing